Battoulah, also called Gulf Burqa, is a metallic-looking fashion mask traditionally worn by Muslim Arab women. The mask is mainly worn in the Persian Gulf region, including Bahrain, Kuwait, United Arab Emirates, Oman, Iraq and Qatar, as well as in southern Iran. Wearing the mask usually indicated that the person is married. The mask was also used as a ruse to fool enemies into thinking that the women they spied from a distance were men.

Origin
The origin of the battoulah is unknown, Multiple theories exist on where it have originated. It is thought to have entered the Eastern Arabian Peninsula from Gujarat in late 18th century.

Variants
Various variants of the Battoulah exist, including between cities and regions. In Dubai and Abu Dhabi, the "Zabeel cut" design, which has a narrow top and broad with a curved bottom is worn. In Sharjah it resembles the Zabeel cut but is shaped so the top of the mask is inclined forwards. The Al Ain design features both a narrow top and bottom. The Bahraini and Qatari burqa is square. In Oman and Fujairah it is very large and broader at the top with a tip that goes beyond the forehead. In neighbouring Saudi Arabia, the niqab is worn instead. In southern provinces of Iran, Shia women wear red rectangular masks, while those of Sunni women are black or indigo with gold, similar to the mask worn in the Arabian peninsula. In Qeshm, the masks were designed to fool invaders, so they would mistake women for male soldiers.

Gallery

See also 
 Alasho
 Shayla
 Haik (garment)

Notes

References 

Arab culture
Arabic clothing
Islamic female clothing